Kazakhstan competed at the 2017 World Aquatics Championships in Budapest, Hungary from 14 July to 30 July.

Open water swimming

Kazakhstan has entered five open water swimmers

Swimming

Kazakh swimmers have achieved qualifying standards in the following events (up to a maximum of 2 swimmers in each event at the A-standard entry time, and 1 at the B-standard):

Synchronized swimming

Kazakhstan's synchronized swimming team consisted of 11 athletes (11 female).

Women

 Legend: (R) = Reserve Athlete

Water polo

Kazakhstan qualified both a men's and women's teams.

Men's tournament

Team roster

Madikhan Makhmetov
Yevgeniy Medvedev (C)
Stanislav Shvedov
Roman Pilipenko
Altay Altayev
Alexey Shmider
Murat Shakenov
Yulian Verdesh
Rustam Ukumanov
Mikhail Ruday
Ravil Manafov
Bolat Turlykhanov
Valeriy Shlemov

Group play

Playoffs

9th–12th place semifinals

Eleventh place game

Women's tournament

Team roster

Alexandra Zharkimbayeva
Sivilya Raiter
Aizhan Akilbayeva
Anna Turova
Kamila Zakirova
Darya Roga
Anna Novikova
Oxana Saichuk
Anastassiya Yeremina
Zamira Myrzabekova
Anastassiya Mirshina
Assem Mussarova (C)
Azhar Alibayeva

Group play

13th–16th place semifinals

15th place game

References

Nations at the 2017 World Aquatics Championships
Kazakhstan at the World Aquatics Championships
2017 in Kazakhstani sport